Alan Cathcart may refer to:

 Alan Cathcart, 3rd Earl Cathcart (1828–1905), landowner and writer on agriculture
 Alan Cathcart, 6th Earl Cathcart (1919–1999), British Army officer